Pinky Vodka is a blended vodka created in Sweden in 2008. It became the second best-selling "super premium" vodka in World Duty Free stores, with 12% of category share in the year of its launch.

The 80-proof (40% alcohol by volume) flavored vodkas are sold in the U.S. and globally in a perfume bottle, and are marketed as super ultra-premium. The brand is currently owned by the United Breweries group.

Awards 
 2009 Gold Medal - Beverage Testing Institute 
 2009 Gold Medal - Frontier Magazine Buyers' Forum Award  
 2009 Medal Winner, Packaging Design - San Francisco World Spirits Competition.
 2009 Medal Winner - San Francisco World Spirits Competition.

See also
Vodka infusion

References

Additional sources
 Solman, Gregory (February 18, 2008.) "Ground Zero Takes Stake in Pinky Vodka." Adweek Magazine. Accessed September 2011.
 Zinko, Carolyne (February 1, 2009.)"Pinky vodka for rosy Valentine's Day." SFGate.com. Accessed September 2011.

External links

Swedish vodkas